Myriam Moscona (מרים מוסקונה) (born 1955 in Mexico City) is a Mexican journalist, translator and poet in the Ladino and Spanish languages who comes from a Bulgarian Sephardi Jewish family. She teaches at Miami University. She was the artist in-residence from the Banff Centre for the Arts in 2000.

Awards
 2006 Guggenheim Fellowship
 1998 Aguascalientes National Poetry Award, for Las visitantes.

Selected works

Poem
Rectas son las curvas de Moebius/En torcedumbre y doloridos/Con esas cintas nos krearon
LA CINTA DE MOEBIUS
Moebius' curves are straight/Within twisting and sorrow/We were created with these ribbons
MOEBIUS RIBBON

IMER
"Instructivo para descifrar un mal", IMER

Books 
Último jardín El Tucán de Virginia, 1983
Las visitantes (1989, Premio Nacional de Poesía de Aguascalientes)
Las preguntas de Natalia Illustrator Fernando Medina, CIDCLI, 1991, ; CIDCLI, 1997, 
El árbol de los nombres Secretaría de Cultura, Gobierno de Jalisco, 1992, 
De frente y de perfil: Semblanzas de poetas Ciudad de México, DDF, 1994
Vísperas Fondo de Cultura Económica, 1996, 
Negro marfil Universidad Autónoma Metropolitana, 2000; Universidad del Claustro de Sor Juana, 2006
El que nada, Ediciones Era, 2006, 
En la superficie azul, Costa Rica 2008.
De par en par (2009)
Tela de Sevoya (2012)

Anthologies
"Excerpt from Black Ivory", The Oxford Book of Latin American Poetry: A Bilingual Anthology, Editors Cecilia Vicuña, Ernesto Livon-Grosman, Oxford University Press US, 2009,
The River Is Wide/el Rio Es Ancho: Twenty Mexican Poets, Editor Marlon L. Fick, Translator Marlon L. Fick, UNM Press, 2005,

Review
Ivory Black'''s edition was made by Sandra Lorenzano, rector of the UCSJ, with a foreword by the Chilean writer Soledad Bianchi. Se trata de un poema de largo aliento, una suma de fragmentos que construyen el conjunto" de versos que, en algunos tramos, se pueden leer de diversas maneras: de izquierda a derecha, de derecha a izquierda, de arriba hacia abajo y viceversa. It is a long-winded poem,''a sum of fragments that make up the whole "of verses which, in some sections, can be read in different ways: from left to right, right to left, top to bottom and vice versa.

References

1955 births
Living people
Judaeo-Spanish-language writers
Judaeo-Spanish-language poets
Mexican women poets
Writers from Mexico City
Mexican Sephardi Jews
Jewish poets
20th-century Sephardi Jews
21st-century Sephardi Jews
Mexican people of Bulgarian-Jewish descent
Mexican women journalists
Mexican expatriates in the United States